The 2019–20 season was A.S. Livorno Calcio's second consecutive season in second division of the Italian football league, the Serie B, and the 105th as a football club.

Players

First-team quad
.

Out on loan

Pre-season and friendlies

Competitions

Overall record

Serie A

League table

Results summary

Results by round

Matches
The league fixtures were announced on 6 August 2019.

Coppa Italia

References

U.S. Livorno 1915 seasons
Livorno